Reanne Weruche Opia (born 11 April 1987) is a British-Nigerian actress and entrepreneur. She is the founding CEO of the clothing line Jesus Junkie Clothing. She was nominated for a British Academy Television Award for her performance in the BBC miniseries I May Destroy You (2020).

Early life and education
Born in Lagos, Opia moved to South East London at the age of 13. Her father is an author and professor of social sciences and her mother is veteran Nigerian broadcaster and television host Ruth Benamaisia-Opia. Opia holds a degree in drama and sociology from the University of the West of England, Bristol.

Career
After making her television debut with a guest appearance in a 2010 episode of The Bill, Opia spent a year with the Renegade Theatre Company in Nigeria. Upon returning to England in 2012, she appeared in the Channel 4 crime drama Top Boy and the Channel 5 procedural Suspects.

Opia gained prominence through her role as Cleopatra Ofoedo in the third series of the BBC comedy Bad Education and its 2015 spinoff film. Opia was nominated in 2015 in the Nollywood Actress of the Year category at the 2015 Nigeria Entertainment Awards for her role in the film When Love Happens. From 2019 to 2020, Opia was in the main cast of the Dave sitcom Sliced as Naomi.

Opia starred as Terry Pratchard in Michaela Coel's BBC series I May Destroy You, which first aired in June 2020. For her performance, Opia was nominated for a British Academy Television Award and won a Black Reel Award. In 2022, she appeared in the ITV thriller Our House.

Filmography

Film

Television

Stage

Awards and nominations

References

External links
 
 Weruche Opia at Curtis Brown

Living people
1987 births
21st-century British actresses
21st-century Nigerian actresses
Actresses from Lagos
Actresses from London
Alumni of the University of the West of England, Bristol
Black British actresses
British businesspeople
Nigerian businesspeople
Nigerian chief executives
Nigerian emigrants to the United Kingdom
Nigerian film actresses
People from Thamesmead